The Istituto per le Applicazioni del Calcolo Mauro Picone, abbreviated IAC, is an applied mathematics institute, part of the Consiglio Nazionale delle Ricerche. It was founded in 1927 as a private research institute by Mauro Picone, and as such it is considered the first applied and computational mathematics institute of such kind ever founded.

Historical notes
The IAC was founded 1927 by Mauro Picone, while working at the University of Naples Federico II and at the Istituto Universitario Navale as professor of infinitesimal calculus. Luigi Amoroso also contributed to the founding of the institute, by providing to his former Normale schoolfellow Picone the funding for the creation of the Institute by means of the Banco di Napoli.
It was only in 1932, when Picone moved from the University of Naples to the Sapienza University of Rome, that the Institute became part of the Italian National Research Council.

See also
Istituto Nazionale di Alta Matematica Francesco Severi

Notes

References 

. A survey paper on the contribution of Mauro Picone and his school to applied mathematics through the foundation and the direction of the "Istituto per le Applicazioni del Calcolo".
. The preprint version of the original paper is downloadable from the author's academic web page.
. The chapter on Picone in a book collecting brief biographical sketches and bibliographies of the scientific works produced by the mathematicians who taught at the Parthenope University of Naples during their stay.
. An ample survey paper on results on the solutions of linear integral and partial differential equation obtained by the research team of Mauro Picone at the Istituto Nazionale per le Applicazioni del Calcolo, by using methods from functional analysis. 
. "" is an historical conference on the work and personality of Mauro Picone, pronounced by Gaetano Fichera.
. Fichera's "last lesson" of the course of higher analysis, given on the occasion of his retirement from university teaching in 1992.
.
. "Mauro Picone and the Istituto Nazionale per le Applicazioni del Calcolo" is a brief historical survey of Picone's role in the founding of the Istituto Nazionale per le Applicazioni del Calcolo: the Author is one of his pupils, former workers and then director of the institute. It was presented at the International congress in occasion of the celebration of the centenary of birth of Mauro Picone and Leonida Tonelli (held in Rome on May 6–9, 1985): an English translation of the title of the conference is:-The work of Leonida Tonelli and his influence on scientific thinking in this century.
.

Mathematical institutes
Organizations established in 1927
Research institutes in Italy
1927 establishments in Italy